Seyfabad-e Khaleseh (also Romanized as Seyfābād-e Khāleşeh) was a village in Saidabad Rural District, in the Central District of Savojbolagh County, Alborz Province, Iran. At the 2006 census, its population was 5,249, in 1,281 families.  It was joined with Seyfabad-e Bozorg to form the city of Golsar.

References 

Populated places in Savojbolagh County